Pamela Nash (born 24 June 1984) is a British Labour Party politician, who was the Member of Parliament (MP) for Airdrie and Shotts between 2010 and 2015. She is currently the Chief Executive of Scotland in Union, a campaign group launched in March 2015 to help keep Scotland within the United Kingdom.

During her time in parliament, she was the youngest MP in the House of Commons.

Early life and career
Pamela Nash was born in Airdrie, North Lanarkshire, and educated locally at St Margaret's High School, Airdrie and Chapelhall. Nash lost her mother and stepfather when she was 17.

She spent her first summer after high school volunteering at a school in Nyeri, Kenya, and followed this up with a placement in Uganda during her time at university. She studied politics at the University of Glasgow, specialising in human rights and international development.

Nash was the parliamentary officer for the Young Fabians and a member of the Scottish Youth Parliament, where she served on the executive committee and was the convenor of the External Affairs Committee. She interned for John Reid for one year as his constituency assistant and subsequently was employed for a period of three years as his parliamentary assistant.

Political career
Nash was selected as the Labour Party candidate from an all-women shortlist which, at the time, proved to be a contentious issue. The constituency chairman, Brian Brady resigned over the issue. Nevertheless, 80% of the constituency Labour Party took part in the selection process. She was elected as the Member of Parliament for Airdrie and Shotts in 2010, replacing the retiring John Reid. She had a majority of 12,408 over the SNP and, at the age of 25, was the youngest MP in the House of Commons, also called Baby of the House. The then leader of the Labour MSPs in the Scottish Parliament, Iain Gray said she had a "big future in Scottish politics".

Nash was the Parliamentary Private Secretary to the then Shadow Secretary of State for International Development, Jim Murphy. She was previously Parliamentary Private Secretary to Margaret Curran as Shadow Secretary of State for Scotland and to Vernon Coaker as Shadow Secretary of State for Northern Ireland. She served on the Finance Bill 2011 Public Bill Committee. Nash was a member of the Science and Technology Select Committee, the Scottish Affairs Select Committee and the Parliamentary Space Committee.

Following the death of the Labour MP David Cairns, she was elected as the Chair of the All-Party Parliamentary Group for HIV and AIDS. She was also the Treasurer of the All-Party Parliamentary Group for Multiple Sclerosis and the Secretary of the All-Party Parliamentary Group on Sustainable Housing. Nash also founded and chaired the All-Party Parliamentary Group on Youth Unemployment.

In September 2010, Nash decided to support David Miliband in the Labour Party leadership election. On 2 December 2010, Nash took part in a BBC debate on age differences in politics and the wider society with the Conservative MP Bill Cash. Nash pledged to oppose the repeal of the Hunting Act 2004 which banned hunting of wild mammals with hounds.

Nash has campaigned on issues such as Blacklisting in employment, breaches of the National Minimum Wage, closure of local police stations and the Bedroom tax.

Nash was narrowly reselected by the Airdrie and Shotts branch of the Labour Party to contest her seat in the next UK general election. A total of 55 members voted for her to be reselected out of 101 members who attended the October 2013 ballot, with 37 opposed. At the 2015 general election, Nash lost her seat to Neil Gray of the Scottish National Party who won by a majority of 8,779 votes.

In August 2017, it was announced that Nash is to be the next Chief Executive of Scotland in Union, in succession to Graeme Pearson.

In 2021, Nash  attempted to be selected as the Labour candidate for the Airdrie and Shotts parliamentary by-election, however she was unsuccessful losing the nomination to Kenneth Stevenson.

References

External links
Pamela Nash MP personal website
Pamela Nash MP on Twitter

Pamela Nash, Labour candidate for Airdrie & Shotts, Robert Mitchell, Wishaw Press, 5 May 2010

|-

1984 births
Living people
Alumni of the University of Glasgow
Members of the Parliament of the United Kingdom for Scottish constituencies
Scottish Labour MPs
UK MPs 2010–2015
People from Airdrie, North Lanarkshire
Female members of the Parliament of the United Kingdom for Scottish constituencies
21st-century Scottish women politicians
21st-century Scottish politicians
Members of the Fabian Society
Politicians from North Lanarkshire